The Labour and Freedom Alliance (Turkish: Emek ve Özgürlük İttifakı, Kurdish: Hevkariya Ked û Azadiyê) is a left-wing electoral alliance in Turkey, formed by Peoples' Democratic Party (HDP), Workers' Party of Turkey (TİP), Labour Party (EMEP), Labourist Movement Party (EHP), Social Freedom Party (TÖP) and Federation of Socialist Assemblies (SMF). Later, the Green Left Party (YSP) joined the alliance. The alliance declared its foundation on the 25th August 2022. In their declaration, the member parties jointly proclaimed that the alliance aims "equality, freedom, fraternity, peace and democracy for the Turkish society."

Foundation 
The initial process of alliance negotiations started with meetings of individual parties. In early 2022, HDP openly called for left-wing parties to build a political alliance and invited TİP, EMEP, EHP, TÖP, SMF, SOL Parti and TKP for a preliminary gathering and discussion. SOL Parti immediately announced that they would not participate in discussions, citing disagreements on timing and strategy, while TKP declared their withdrawal after the first meeting. Although part of the meetings throughout, Halkevleri decided to not take part in the final formation of the alliance due to their reluctance to focus on upcoming elections, although adding that they would support the goals of the alliance.The parties declared that the political program and the roadmap of the alliance will be announced in Haliç Congress Center, İstanbul on 24 September 2022. Eighty literary figures from Turkey, including names like Murathan Mungan, Zülfü Livaneli, İnci Aral and Ahmet Ümit, signed a public declaration to support the alliance's foundation and its political goals.

Ideology 
The member parties declared they would announce the alliance's guiding principles and political programme in September 2022. The leader of EMEP,  pointed out that the strengthening of secularism, the democratization of the country, equal citizenship rights and putting an end to the economic, societal and environmental exploitation are the main political focuses while adding that the alliance should aim to expand beyond its current members. Erkan Baş, leader of TİP, maintained that the alliance should constitute a credible alternative for "millions of people who are not (properly) represented by Nation or People's Alliance" and successfully encompass "workers, young people, farmers, women, LGBTI community, Kurds and Alevis".

Per the political declaration of the alliance, the parties offer an egalitarian, environmentalist, democratic and feminist vision for Turkey, while denouncing the pro-business, crony capitalist, neo-liberal and authoritarian practices of Recep Tayyip Erdoğan and AKP governments.

Composition

Non-governmental organizations

See also
Union of Socialist Forces
United June Movement
Labour, Democracy and Freedom Bloc
Thousand Hope Candidates
Peoples' Democratic Congress

Notes

References

2022 establishments in Turkey
Far-left politics in Turkey
Left-wing political party alliances
Peoples' Democratic Party (Turkey)
Political parties established in 2022
Political party alliances in Turkey
Socialist parties in Turkey